Assumpta Achuo-Bei (born 27 April 1968) is a Cameroonian sprinter. She competed in the women's 400 metres at the 1988 Summer Olympics.

References

External links
 

1968 births
Living people
Athletes (track and field) at the 1988 Summer Olympics
Cameroonian female sprinters
Cameroonian female middle-distance runners
Olympic athletes of Cameroon
Place of birth missing (living people)
Olympic female sprinters